Dioscorea quartiniana is a climbing tuber geophyte in the family Dioscoreaceae. It is native to Benin, Botswana, Burundi, Chad, Congo, Côte d'Ivoire (Ivory Coast), Eritrea, Ethiopia, Gambia, Ghana, Kenya, Madagascar, Malawi, Mozambique, Namibia, Nigeria, Rwanda, Sierra Leone, South Africa, Sudan, Tanzania, Uganda, Zambia, and Zimbabwe. This species occurs in forests, grasslands, and rocky areas.

Uses
It is cultivated for food in Cameroon and East Nigeria.

References

Crops originating from Africa
quartiniana